FilmXtra Uncut is a 30-minute movie review show launched in February 2010 on Film24, a UK television channel available on Sky Digital 157. Otherwise known as FXU, the show airs every Friday at 22.00 and reviews current theatrical and home entertainment film releases, with an emphasis on post-watershed content. The show also includes a celebrity gossip section entitled Bitesize Movie Gossip. Full episodes are available to view at the official Film24 website.

FXU is produced by Kobiyoshi Productions as a commission for Film24. The show is written, presented and edited by Tim Fornara, who was previously a member of the Film24 presenting team.  Anna Krahn co-presents the Bitesize Movie Gossip section and is also the Editor of the official Film24 website.

FilmXtra Uncut is the late-night edition of the Film Xtra movie review show, also shown on Film24 and produced by Starstruck Media.

Crew 

Written, Presented, Produced and Edited- Tim Fornara

Researcher- Amie Jackson

Online Editor- John Pearce

BMG presented by- Anna Krahn

BMG written by- Amie Jackson

Original Music- David Whitmey and Tim Fornara

Executive Producer- Andrew Burns

References

Sky UK original programming
2010 British television series debuts
Film criticism television series